Degrmen is a village in the municipality of Kuršumlija, Serbia. According to the 2011 census, the village has a population of 96 people. The village has an area of 12.9 km2 (5.0 mi2).

References

Populated places in Toplica District